Pennsylvania Railroad 1361 is a 4-6-2 K4 "Pacific" type steam locomotive built in May 1918 by the Pennsylvania Railroad's (PRR) Juniata Shops in Altoona, Pennsylvania. It hauled mainline passenger and mail trains in Pennsylvania, including commuter trains in Central New Jersey on the PRR until its retirement from revenue service in 1956. Restored to operating condition for excursion service in 1987, No. 1361 along with its only surviving sister locomotive, No. 3750, were designated as the official state steam locomotives by the Pennsylvania General Assembly. In 1988, it was sidelined due to mechanical problems and was currently owned by the Railroaders Memorial Museum (RMM) in Altoona, Pennsylvania, who were currently attempting to return No. 1361 back to operating condition.

History

Design changes, revenue service, and retirement as a display

No. 1361 was one of 425 K4 class steam locomotives built between 1914 and 1928 for the Pennsylvania Railroad (PRR) as their standard passenger locomotive. Built in May 1918 at PRR's Juniata Shops in Altoona, Pennsylvania, No. 1361 was assigned to haul PRR's express passenger and mail trains between New York City and Chicago, Illinois, via the PRR Main Line. During the 1920s, No. 1361 was re-equipped with an electric headlight, a steel bar pilot, and a keystone style number plate. Additionally, the PRR's express passenger trains grew longer and heavier, which led to No. 1361 and the other K4s required to double head and even triple head each other.

When the PRR's Eastern Region line between New York and Harrisburg, Pennsylvania was electrified in the 1930s, No. 1361 was relocated to the Central Division, running between Harrisburg and Pittsburgh, Pennsylvania. After World War II, No. 1361 was re-equipped with a cast steel pilot and folding coupler along with its headlight and dynamo's positions switched from the front and top of the smokebox. Additionally, a platform stand was added to the bottom front of No. 1361's smokebox for the locomotive crew to attend and inspect its headlight and dynamo.

In the early 1950s, 72 K4s, including No. 1361, were reassigned to haul commuter trains between Perth Amboy and Bay Head, New Jersey on the New York and Long Branch line as their main line duties were taken over by the diesel locomotives. In May 1956, No. 1361 was retired from the PRR and was cosmetically refurbished to be on static display next to the PRR's famous Horseshoe Curve on June 8, 1957. It had traveled over  during its revenue service. For three decades, No. 1361 sat on display outside exposed to the elements, so the members of the Horseshoe Curve Chapter of the National Railway Historical Society (NRHS) were volunteered to repaint and maintain the locomotive.

Short excursion service
On September 5, 1985, PRR's successor Conrail and Assemblyman Richard Geist removed No. 1361 from its display site and moved it to the Railroaders Memorial Museum (RMM) in Altoona for its fifth anniversary on September 16. There were originally plans to have the No. 1361 locomotive cosmetically restored again, but the RMM have seek interest in restoring it to operating condition for excursion service. On April 15, 1986, the restoration work of No. 1361 began at Conrail's ex-PRR Altoona Car Shop. No. 1361's former display location at the Horseshoe Curve was taken over by an EMD GP9 diesel locomotive No. 7048, painted in PRR livery.

On April 12, 1987, the No. 1361 locomotive moved under its own power for the first time in 31 years and made its first excursion run from Altoona to Bellefonte, Pennsylvania. It also ran excursion trains on the Nittany and Bald Eagle Railroad and Northern Central Railway. On December 18, 1987, the Pennsylvania General Assembly designated Nos. 1361 and 3750 as the official state steam locomotives; the same bill designated the GG1 4859 as the state electric locomotive. In 1988, the No. 1361 locomotive suffered a main bearing and drive axle catastrophic failure, resulting in it being sidelined from excursion service indefinitely for a complete rebuild.

Second attempt restoration
In 1996, the No. 1361 locomotive was disassembled and moved to the Steamtown National Historic Site in Scranton, Pennsylvania. It was originally going to be restored through a partnership between Steamtown, the University of Scranton, and the RMM. But the restoration work progressed slowly due to some its original parts needed to be replaced with fabricated duplicates. Scheduled completion dates were repeatedly pushed back and the restoration work had cost $1.7 million. In 2008, the plans to rebuild No. 1361 at the Steamtown facilities were cancelled due to the RMM stopped paying out the funds and made the decision to return the remains of the locomotive and its parts back to the RMM. In 2010, most of No. 1361's parts such as the cab, driving wheels, frame, and tender have returned to the RMM, but the boiler and the other parts were stored at the East Broad Top Railroad shops in Orbisonia, Pennsylvania. In 2015, the museum had completed the construction of their new Harry Bennett Memorial Roundhouse to store No. 1361's boiler, tender, frame, and other part components.

Third restoration

In May 2018, restoration hopes were renewed when former Philadelphia commissioner Bennett Levin and former Amtrak CEO Wick Moorman announced the creation of a private restoration fund. No. 1361 needed a newly welded boiler, which would cost at least $1,000,000. Levin and Moorman also announced that once the No. 1361 locomotive was fully restored, it will eventually pull a set of ex-PRR P70 passenger cars and B60 baggage cars for use as a demonstration exhibit train.

In February 2019, the group has planned to design a new boiler in order to meet the current Federal Railroad Administration (FRA) and mechanical engineering standards. In October 2019, No. 1361's tender was fully repaired and upgraded with rolling bearing trucks along with its water scoop was restored for demonstration purposes. On June 24, 2021, the museum announced that they hired the contracting firm FMW Solutions to rebuild No. 1361's boiler with a new firebox. The total cost of the restoration work are estimated to be $2.6 million. In October 2021, the old firebox was completely removed from No. 1361's boiler as part of FMW Solutions' total renovation. 

In late June 2022, the construction of No. 1361's new firebox was commenced. At the same time, the Pennsylvania Railroad Technical and Historical Society (PRRTHS) donated $100,512.33 to the RRM for the construction. On October 14, 2022, the RMM went into partnership with the Western Maryland Scenic Railroad (WMSR) in Cumberland, Maryland to run an evening fundraiser excursion being pulled by WSMR's No. 1309 steam locomotive with more than $13,000 raised to benefit No. 1361's restoration. Additionally, the latter's PRR 3 chime whistle was fitted on the former. By December 2022, the new firebox started was nearing completion, although with thicker steel and other modifications of the 1914 design in order to comply with current FRA safety requirements. On February 13, 2023, the RMM acquired an ex-PRR B60b baggage car from the Railway Excursion Management Company for use behind the proposed No. 1361 exhibition train.

See also
Atlanta and West Point 290
Baltimore and Ohio 5300
Boston and Maine 3713
Pennsylvania Railroad 1737
Reading and Northern 425
Southern Railway 1401

References

Bibliography

Further reading

External links

Pennsylvania Railroad K4 1361 - The Railroaders Memorial Museum

4-6-2 locomotives
Individual locomotives of the United States
1361
Railway locomotives introduced in 1918
Symbols of Pennsylvania
Standard gauge locomotives of the United States
Preserved steam locomotives of Pennsylvania